A very light jet (VLJ), entry-level jet or personal jet, previously known as a microjet, is a category of small business jets seating four to eight people. VLJs are considered the lightest business jets and are approved for single-pilot operation.

History
The first small jet-powered civil aircraft, the 1950s Morane-Saulnier MS.760 Paris, has been retroactively suggested as being the first VLJ, as it seats four with a single pilot and is smaller than modern VLJs. The production of MS.760 differs from modern business jets in having a sliding canopy for cabin access rather than a door; a six-seat version with an enclosed cabin and a conventional door was canceled after a single prototype was built.

Two unbuilt Cessna aircraft of the 1950s and 1960s would have met the definition of a VLJ. The first was the 407, a four-seat civil version of the T-37 jet trainer proposed in 1959; however, the 407 never progressed past the mockup stage due to insufficient customer interest.

Other attempts to create small jet aircraft in this class in the 1970s and 1980s were the Gulfstream Aerospace FanJet 1500 and the CMC Leopard.

After a flurry of interest in the Small Aircraft Transportation System (SATS) and air taxi markets in the early 2000s, the VLJ sector underwent significant expansion. Several new designs were produced, such as the Embraer Phenom 100, the Cessna Citation Mustang, and the Eclipse 500. However, following the late 2000s recession the air taxi market underperformed expectations, and both Eclipse Aviation and air taxi firm DayJet collapsed. In December 2010, AvWeb's Paul Bertorelli explained that the term very light jet has lost favor in the aviation industry: "Personal jet is the description du jour. You don't hear the term VLJ—very light jet—much anymore and some people in the industry tell me they think it's because that term was too tightly coupled to Eclipse, a failure that the remaining players want to, understandably, distance themselves from."

Single-engine designs were popular in the mid-2000s, before the global financial crisis diminished the market appeal of the category. Most of those projects, which included the Piper Altaire, Diamond D-Jet, Eclipse 400 and VisionAire Vantage, were all shelved.  As of 2016, the only maintained aircraft are the Cirrus Vision SF50, which was type certified that year and put into production, and the Stratos 714, which at the time expected certification in 2019. Single-engine VLJs are expected to compete with single turboprop aircraft.

Two VLJs in history have won the Collier Trophy, known as the most prestigious aerospace engineering award in the United States — the Eclipse 500 (in 2006) and the Cirrus Vision Jet (SF50, in 2018).

Target market
In the United States, the Small Aircraft Transportation System is aimed at providing air service to areas ignored by airlines.

Florida-based air taxi provider DayJet, which on October 3, 2007 began its Eclipse 500 service, planned to operate more than 1,000 of the VLJs within five years, and had stated in mid-2007 that it planned to operate 300 Eclipse 500s serving 40 regional airports in the Southeastern United States by the end of 2008.  DayJet ceased operations on September 19, 2008.

Production

Many models are under development or awaiting certification, while others have failed. Six have so far made deliveries to customers:
 2006–2017 : Cessna Citation Mustang
 2006–2008 : Eclipse 500 / 2014–2017 : 550
 2008–present : Embraer Phenom 100
 2013–present : Cessna CitationJet/M2
 2015–present : Honda HA-420 HondaJet
 2016–present : Cirrus Vision SF50

The Cessna Citation Mustang was the first production VLJ, first delivered in November 2006, and discontinued in May 2017, and the Cirrus Vision SF50 is the first single-engine production VLJ, beginning deliveries in December 2016.

Business jet sales suffered due to the late 2000s recession. The General Aviation Manufacturers Association reported in November 2010 that third quarter business jet sales were down 20.3% over the same period in 2009, with light jets suffering the most. In 2020, business jet deliveries slowed again due to the COVID-19 pandemic, with a 20% decrease over the previous year. However, the industry bounced back the following year, in 2021, with a 10% increase over 2020 and a single VLJ delivery more than in 2019. The Cessna Mustang is the most-delivered VLJ with 479 total from 2006 through 2017, the Eclipse 500 has the most deliveries in a single year with 161 in 2008, and the Cirrus Vision Jet is the most-delivered since 2018 with 393 in the last five years.

Engines

Interior amenities
When these smaller jets were first mooted, there was much interest in the fact that they would not have a lavatory on board, with articles discussing the matter in The New York Times and items on NBC Nightly News. Despite this, the Eclipse 500 had the option of an electric flush, remove-to-service lavatory with a privacy curtain - at the expense of one passenger seat, and the proposed Adam A700 design had a seven-seat configuration with rear lavatory with a privacy curtain. The Cessna Mustang also has an emergency toilet, but it is located between the cockpit and cabin. The Embraer Phenom 100 offers a fully enclosed lavatory with a solid door. The 2015 Honda HA-420 HondaJet has a full lavatory at the rear of the aircraft with flushing toilet, full sink and closing door.

List

Notes

References

 The VLJ (Very Light Jet) Market 2006-2017
 Evaluating the Efficiency of a Small Aircraft Transportation System Network Using Planning and Simulation Models (2006)
 Nationwide Impacts of Very Light Jet Traffic in the Future Next Generation Air Transportation System (NGATS) (2006)
 A Transportation Systems Analysis Model (TSAM) to study the impact of the Small Aircraft Transportation System (SATS) (2005)
 An Integrated Model To Study The Small Aircraft Transportation System (SATS) (2003)

External links
 EBACE 2006 Show preview (series of articles), Flight International, April/May 2006
 Time for an Eclipse?, Aviation Week, April 2006
 VLJs fly in the face of critics, Aviation International News, March 2006
 Flight Interview: Vision of Eclipse Aviation's Vern silences the sceptics, Flight International, March 2006
 Dawn of the VLJ, Flight International, May 2005
 NBAA
 Transportation Systems Analysis Model - TSAM is a nationwide transportation planning model to forecast air taxi demand in the United States.

Business aircraft
Very light jets